Ranajita Malla (Devanagari: रणजीत मल्ल) was a Malla Dynasty King of Bhaktapur, Nepal from 1722 to 1769. He was the last Malla king of Bhaktapur and of Nepal who left for Kashi after his defeat by the Gorkhali forces of Prithivi Narayan Shah. He is widely known for his contributions to Nepal Bhasa literature. Ranajit Malla is also known for his democratic values and was known to allow his citizens to openly criticize him.

Early life 

Ranajit Malla was born to Bhupatindra Malla and Vishwo Lakshmi Malla on 26 January  1703. He had a very happy and comfortable childhood with his mother Vishwo Lakshmi and his grandmother Lalamati. As he was born in a politically messy time his father taught him politics at a young age.

Physical contributions 
Ranajit Malla like many other Malla Kings of Bhaktapur contributed in beautifying Bhaktapur by building many heritages. As Ranajit Malla reign was in a politically unstable period, his contributions are few compared to his forefathers.

Lūn Dhwākhā
Known among tourists as the Golden gate, Lūn Dhwākhā is the entrance to the Mulā Chwōkā containing the shrine of Taleju. As per the gilt copper inscription on the gate, it was installed on the year 874 of the Nepalese era(=1753AD) by King Ranajit Malla and his Queen Jay(Buddhi) Lakshmi Malla. Although it is said that a golden gate on the entrance to the shrine of Taleju was originally planned to be built four generations before Ranajit by King Naresha Malla but none of the kings before him could build it due to the lack of gold. Ranajit however used the profits that he gained from trading with the Tibetans on building the golden gate.

The bell of Taleju 
Right in the front of the Golden gate on a tall platform is a gaint bell that is played while doing the Puja of Taleju. This kind of bell is present on the Durbar Square of both Patan and Kathmandu. Locally known as Tagoun Gān(  ), its sound was once said to be heard anywhere in the town. This bell was installed by Ranajit Malla on 6 January 1737AD.

Sāfukuthi 
Sāfukuthi also sometimes referred as Sākothā was said to be a big library presently located at Sākothā tole in Bhaktapur. Ranajit Malla is said to have loved collecting old and antique things which were kept in the Sāfukuthi along with various books relating to religion, science and medicine. Most of the books and manuscript present in the library were destroyed by fire during the Battle of Bhaktapur and the building itself was completely destroyed during the earthquake of 1833 and 2015.

Literary contribution 
Among all the kings of Bhaktapur, Ranajit Malla is considered a pioneer in Nepal bhasa literature. Most of the songs in old songbooks of Bhaktapur bear his signature. He himself was a prolific singer himself and was said to have spent more time reciting poems and songs than the politics of the kingdom. Besides songs, he also wrote various plays like Indrābijaya, Ushāharan, Krishnacharitra. He also authored many books like Rukmaniharan, Pshatdarshana etc. Most of his works were written in the Newari script in a Newari-cum-Sanskrit language.

Many of Ranajit Malla's creations are devotional Dāphā and Rāga songs. His works   still quite popular among the singers of Bhaktapur. One of his most popular work is a Newari song he wrote for the annual Biska Jatra titled 'Thō thēn jāgū rasan'. This song written in the seasonal Pahan Charhe tune is still sung as a seasonal song during Biska Jatra in Bhaktapur. Hé Síva Bhairava is another song sung before the chariot procession of Biska Jatra and is also written by Ranajit Malla in the Bhairava Rāga.

As Ranajit Malla aged, his interest in singing started to increase. By the time of the Battle of Bhaktapur, the old Ranajit had almost given up on politics and spent most of his time on singing devotional songs. As he was singing hymns and ragas while waiting for Yama to take him, Bhaktapur was mostly in the hands of his sons who were supportive of the Gorkha King. The invading king took advantage of Ranajit's political weakness and  bribed his illegitimate sons who secretly helped the invaders during the Battle and even opened the city gates of Bhaktapur during the Battle to allow the invaders in the city.

After being defeated in the Battle of Bhaktapur by the Gorkhalis, Ranajit Malla was sent to Kashi under his own choice by the Gorkhali King. Deeply saddened by having to leave his kingdom, he composed a Rāga song,  expressing his sorrows in the hills of Chandragiri where he looked at his kingdom for the last time before leaving for Kashi. He is said to have recited this song while crying uncontrollably. The first lines of the song appear below.

Nepal Bhasa
1. hāya hāya rāma rāma gathe maluma nepāla 
2. satru durjananan(g) phutakālayoa(ā)va
3. jhinte dola raje samadatāyo jita vāsa 
4. videsayā vāsa jula thani a(ā)va rama rama
5. hathujana bhāya papan(m) manenāguswoyā dhuno
6. panjalasa chwonā maduthe jinona rāma rāma
7. navadurgā ganesyāke saharsha ji vinati yānā
8. lāsalāpi aparādha kshemā yāhu rama rama
9. lhāya gohmayāke jina dukhayā vedana 
10. thugu pāsa pheniao suna na rama rama
11. piratiyāna vacona chalayata durajanana
12. haya haya chu nugala jula rama rama
13. suryavamsi kulamani sri ranajita malla
14. talejuna vila vaikuntha vasa rama rama

Translation
1. Oh Ram! Oh Ram! How could I survive without remembering Nepal?
2. The evil enemy destroyed me now
3. [There is] no more shelter [for me] in the country of twelve thousand [households]!
4. A foreign land has become my abode now on! Oh Ram! Oh Ram!!
5. As the fruit of the sin that I committed in my previous life,I have already seen what I have not even heard of!
6. There is no point of living in a cage! Oh Ram! Oh Ram!!
7. I pray million times to Goddess Nava-Durga and God Ganesa!
8. For a pardon over the crimes I committed! Oh Ram! Oh Ram!!
9. To how many people the grief of pain I express?
10. No one can make me free from this anguish! Oh Ram! Oh Ram!!
11. Kept on showing affection, the evil [conspirator] deceived [me]!
12. Alas! Alas! What sort of thinking [of mine] caused this? Oh Ram!
13. [To] this Ranajit Malla, the jewel of the Solar Dynasty, A  shelter in heaven is offered by Goddess Taleju! Oh Ram! Oh Ram!!

Relations with other kingdoms 
Ranajit Malla's reign was the most politically messy period in Bhaktapur. The internal conflict among his sons and his queens weakened Bhaktapur form the inside. On top of that Bhaktapur was frequently attacked by both Kantipur and Yela. In order to get military strengthen Bhaktapur Ranajit hoped an alliance with the Kingdom of Gorkha by allowing the Gorkha Prince Prithvi Narayan Shah, who had been rejected by Jaya Prakash Malla of Kantipur, to study in Bhaktapur and also established a Miterirelation between his eldest son Birnarasimha Malla and the Gorkha Prince. Prithivi Narayan Shah, seeing the prosperity of the Malla kingdoms developed an ambition to conquer the kingdoms and become the king of these prosperous kingdoms.

Battle of Bhaktapur 

When both Kantipur and Yela fell to the Gorkha kingdom, the kings of both these kingdoms came to Bhaktapur seeking refuge.

Gallery

See also
 Battle of Bhaktapur

References

Malla rulers of Bhaktapur
Malla rulers of Lalitpur
People from Bhaktapur
18th-century Nepalese people
Nepalese Hindus